Chuquet is a French surname. Notable people with the surname include:

 Arthur Chuquet (1853–1925), French historian and biographer
 Nicolas Chuquet (15th century), French mathematician

See also
 Choquet

French-language surnames